Summer Fun may refer to:
 Summer Fun, a 2021 novel by American author Jeanne Thornton.
 Summer Fun, an annual publication of The Press of Atlantic City
 Summer Fun, a 1991 seasonal special published by Disney Comics (publishing)
 "Summer Fun", a 1980 song by The Barracudas
 "Summer Fun", a 2006 song by Zdenka Predná
 Summer Fun Water Park in Belton, Texas

See also 
 All Girl Summer Fun Band
 Summer Funomenon